Robin Jon Hawes Clark  (16 February 1935 – 6 December 2018) was a New Zealand-born chemist initially noted for research of transition metal and mixed-valence complexes, and later for the use of Raman spectroscopy in determining the chemical composition of pigments used in artworks.

Early life and education
Clark was born in Rangiora, New Zealand on 16 February 1935, to parents Reginald Hawes Clark and Marjorie Alice Clark. He attended Marlborough College, Blenheim, and Christ's College, Christchurch before pursuing bachelor's and master's at Canterbury University College. Clark was a research and teaching fellow under William Fyfe at the University of Otago in 1958. From 1958 to 1961, Clark worked toward a doctorate advised by Ronald Sydney Nyholm and Jack Lewis at University College London and was awarded a PhD degree for his work on titanium complexes in 1961. The University of London later awarded Clark a DSc in 1969.

Career
Clark began teaching at University College London in 1962 as an assistant lecturer. He was appointed Sir William Ramsay Professor in 1989, and served until retirement in 2009. He served as the dean of science from 1988 to 1989 and later as head of the chemistry department from 1989 to 1999.

Clark died in London on 6 December 2018.

Artwork authentication
In 1992, Clark was asked to develop a non-destructive technique to analyze the chemical composition of a painting in such a way to be able to spot art forgeries. He had since developed the use of Raman spectroscopy as an important tool for use in the fields of artwork authentication, conservation, and preservation.

Awards and honours
Over the course of his career, Clark delivered several named lectures and received multiple awards. In 1969, he was elected a fellow of the Royal Society of Chemistry. In 1989, he was granted honorary fellowship by the Royal Society of New Zealand. He became a fellow of the Royal Society of London and member of the Academia Europaea in 1990. Two years later, he was elected a fellow of University College London and the Royal Society of Arts, and in 2001 he was conferred with an honorary DSc by the University of Canterbury. Clark was appointed a Companion of the New Zealand Order of Merit in the 2004 Queen's Birthday Honours, for services to science and New Zealand interests in the United Kingdom, followed by elections as a foreign fellow of the National Academy of Sciences, India in 2007 and as an international member of the American Philosophical Society in 2010. In 2009, Royal Society of Chemistry awarded Clark the Sir George Stokes Award for his contribution to the application of analytical science to the arts and archaeology through his development of Raman microscopy for the identification of pigments.

Selected works

References

1935 births
2018 deaths
New Zealand chemists
University of Canterbury alumni
Alumni of University College London
Academics of University College London
New Zealand emigrants to the United Kingdom
20th-century British chemists
21st-century British chemists
Fellows of the Royal Society
Fellows of the Royal Society of Chemistry
Members of Academia Europaea
Fellows of the Royal Society of New Zealand
Companions of the New Zealand Order of Merit
People from Rangiora
People educated at Marlborough Boys' College
People educated at Christ's College, Christchurch
Fellows of The National Academy of Sciences, India
Members of the American Philosophical Society
Spectroscopists